Qezel Kand, also rendered as Ghezel Kand, may refer to:
 Qezel Kand, Afghanistan
 Qezel Kand, Iran
 Qezel Kand, Razavi Khorasan, Iran
 Qezel Kand-e Olya, Iran
 Qezel Kand-e Sofla, Iran